Yordan Todorov (born 27 July 1981, in Plovdiv) is a Bulgarian footballer who currently plays for German club ESV Regensburg. Mainly a right midfielder, he can also operate as a right back.

Career

Youth career
Todorov was raised in Maritsa Plovdiv's youth teams. He stayed there for 7 years, before he left in 2000.

Chernomorets Burgas
Between 2000 and 2003 played for Chernomorets Burgas. He capped 56 times and scored 8 goals.

CSKA Sofia
Because of his good displays he caught the eye of CSKA scouts and signed for "The red" in the early 2003 for a fee of 150 000 €. With CSKA, Todorov became a champion in 2003, 2005 and 2008, and a national cup winner in 2004. Yordan also won the Bulgarian Supercup in 2006 and 2008.  In July 2008 a media information appeared that Yordan is wanted by German side TSG 1899 Hoffenheim and Israel champions Beitar Jerusalem F.C. but the transfers collapsed in the last moment.
After a series of bad relationships with his coaches, Todorov left CSKA in 2010.

Lokomotiv Plovdiv
In the beginning of 2010, Todorov signed with Lokomotiv Plovdiv. He relaunched his career, scoring 5 goals in 13 matches and making 3 assists until the end of 2009/2010 season.

Steaua București
On 10 June 2010 signed a contract with Steaua București.

On 29 August 2010, he makes debut for Steaua's second team in Liga II against Otopeni.

On 30 August 2010, after only 2 months and a 20 days to Steaua, Romanian team announced release of Todorov, because Victor Piţurcă coach who take him to Steaua resigned on round 3 of new season and the new manager no longer need his services.

Playing style
Todorov plays as a right winger or a right fullback. Todorov plugs in successfully in the attack on the wingside. He is a fast and creative player with good leadership skills.

International career
Todorov has nine matches and two goals for Bulgaria national football team.

Awards
CSKA Sofia
 Champion of Bulgaria – 3 times – 2003, 2005, 2008
 Bulgarian Supercup – 2 times – 2006, 2008
 Bulgarian Cup – 1 time – 2006

References

External links
Yordan Todorov's profile - SteauaFC.com (Romanian)

1981 births
Living people
Bulgarian footballers
First Professional Football League (Bulgaria) players
FC Maritsa Plovdiv players
FC Chernomorets Burgas players
PFC CSKA Sofia players
PFC Lokomotiv Plovdiv players
FC Steaua București players
FC Steaua II București players
PFC Minyor Pernik players
FC Lokomotiv 1929 Sofia players
FC Montana players
Bulgaria international footballers
Association football defenders